Crypsiptya is a genus of moths of the family Crambidae.

Species
 Crypsiptya africalis Maes, 2002
 Crypsiptya coclesalis Walker, 1859
 Crypsiptya megaptyona Hampson, 1918
 Crypsiptya mutuuri (Rose & Pajni, 1979)
 Crypsiptya nereidalis Lederer, 1863
 Crypsiptya ruficostalis Hampson, 1918
 Crypsiptya viettalis Marion, 1956

References

 

Pyraustinae
Crambidae genera
Taxa named by Edward Meyrick